Dzhalil (Cälil) is an urban locality (an urban-type settlement) in Sarmanovsky District of the Republic of Tatarstan, Russia, located near the source of the Menzelya River,  south of Sarmanovo, the administrative center of the district. As of the 2010 Census, its population was 13,937.

History
It was founded in 1964 and was granted urban-type settlement status in 1968.

Administrative and municipal status
Within the framework of administrative divisions, the urban-type settlement of Dzhalil is subordinated to Sarmanovsky District. As a municipal division, Dzhalil, together with three rural localities, is incorporated within Sarmanovsky Municipal District as Dzhalil Urban Settlement.

Economy and infrastructure
As of 1997, two major industrial enterprises in the settlement were Dzhalilneft oil company and a bakery.

Demographics

In 1989, ethnic Tatars accounted for 77.7% of the population, followed by the Russians at 19.6%.

References

Notes

Sources

Urban-type settlements in the Republic of Tatarstan
Populated places established in 1964